is a Japanese manga series written and illustrated by Kei Urana. It began serialization in Kodansha's Weekly Shōnen Magazine in February 2022. As of February 2023, the series' individual chapters have been collected into five volumes.

Plot
Living in the slums of a wealthy society are a population of “tribefolk,” who are descended from criminals exiled from society. Living amongst the tribefolk is a young boy named Rudo, who detests the upper class’s wastefulness. They often dump anything deemed trash, including criminals, into a massive dump site below the town known as the Abyss. Rudo was told by his foster father that his biological father was dumped into the Abyss for a crime before he was born. One day, after rummaging through a dump site, Rudo returns home to find his foster father Regto killed. Apprehended at the scene, Rudo is immediately charged with murder despite his innocence, due to his status as a tribefolk. Unable to escape his fate, Rudo swears revenge upon the people of the city, and is dumped into the Abyss. 

After being dumped into the Abyss, Rudo awakens to find himself disoriented in a foul-smelling, endless landscape of trash. Rudo is then attacked by large beasts made of trash, and fends them off until he is rescued by a man named Engine. Engine explains to Rudo that he is in fact not underground, but has fallen to the surface from “Heaven.” After testing him and awakening his power as a “Giver,” Engine invites Rudo to join him as a “Janitor.” Engine explains that the Janitors are an organization of Givers who use the power of unique weapons known as “Jinki” to hunt the beasts which attacked him. Rudo reluctantly accepts Engine’s offer to join the Janitors, so long as it helps accomplish his goal of returning to Heaven and enacting revenge on those who dumped him into the Abyss.

Characters 

A former resident of the Slums as well as Regto’s adopted son whose false convictions led to him being sentenced to the abyss. After being saved from a group of monsters, he joins the Janitors’ group to assist them in dealing with their affairs. His own realization as a Giver all stems from the fact that his gloves are part of the Jinki, which allows Givers to utilize its “thoughts” for combat. 
 
A fellow member of the janitors’ group who saves Rudo from a horde of monsters. He carries a Jinki called the Unbreaker, which takes the form of an umbrella.
 
A warrior Janitor and master combatant, of whom Engine proclaims as the youngest member of the organization. His Jinki is a staff-like weapon named the Love Stick.

Publication
Written and illustrated by Kei Urana, the series began serialization in Kodansha's Weekly Shōnen Magazine on February 16, 2022. As of February 2023, the series' individual chapters have been collected into five tankōbon volumes.

An "overseas version" is in production.

Volume list

Reception
The columnist for  liked the world building, action, and dark fantasy elements of the story, as well as the main protagonist. Masaki Endo from Tsutaya News liked the artwork and the main protagonist of the series. Atsushi Ohkubo recommended the series.

In the 2022 Next Manga Award, the series ranked thirteenth in the print manga category. It was also the most popular choice among English voters, even though the series has not been released in English. The series ranked fourteenth in the Nationwide Bookstore Employees' Recommended Comics of 2023.

References

External links
  

Action anime and manga
Dark fantasy anime and manga
Kodansha manga
Shōnen manga